In Good Hands is a 2022 Turkish film directed by Ketche, written by Hakan Bonomo and starring Aslı Enver, Kaan Urgancıoğlu and Mert Ege Ak.

Cast 
 Aslı Enver as Melisa
 Kaan Urgancıoğlu as Firat
 Mert Ege Ak as Can
 Ezgi Şenler as Fatoş
 Vural Şahanoğlu
 Latif Koru
 Gizem Özmen
 Sertaç Güder
 Defne Ayşe Özpirinç as Ayşe

References

External links 

 
 

Turkish-language Netflix original films
2020s Turkish-language films